Albert Francis Blakeslee (November 9, 1874 – November 16, 1954) was an American botanist. He is best known for his research on the poisonous jimsonweed plant and the sexuality of fungi. He was the brother of the Far East scholar George Hubbard Blakeslee.

Early life and education 
Albert Francis Blakeslee was born on November 9, 1874 in Geneseo, New York, to Augusta Miranda Hubbard Blakeslee and Francis Durbin Blakeslee, a Methodist minister.

Blakeslee attended Wesleyan University, graduating in 1896. At Wesleyan, Blakeslee played several sports and won academic prizes in mathematics and chemistry.

He received a master's degree from Harvard University in 1900 and a doctorate in 1904. He also studied at the University of Halle-Wittenberg in Germany from 1904 to 1906.

Career
After graduating from Wesleyan, Blakeslee taught at the Montpelier Seminary in Vermont, as well as at the East Greenwich Academy.

His first professorship was at the Connecticut Agricultural College, now known as the University of Connecticut. He was hired by the Carnegie Institution in 1915, eventually becoming its director. 

In 1941, Blakeslee retired from the Carnegie Institution and returned to academia, accepting a professorship at Smith College. He would go on to direct the Smith College Genetics Experimentation Station.

Datura research
At Smith, he performed his research on jimsonweed. Blakeslee used the jimsonweed plant as a model organism for his genetic research. His experiments included using colchicine to achieve an increase in the number of chromosomes, which opened up a new field of research, creating artificial polyploids and aneuploids, and studying the phenotypic effects of polyploidy and of individual chromosomes.

Personal life 
Blakeslee married Margaret Dickson Bridges in 1919.

Blakeslee died in Northampton, Massachusetts on November 16, 1954. He was 80 years old.

Awards and legacy 
Blakeslee was awarded the Bowdoin Prize for this discovery of sexual fusion in fungi.

Selected works

References

Blakeslee, Albert Francis (2005) Encyclopædia Britannica. Retrieved December 1, 2005, from Encyclopædia Britannica Online
Who's Who in New England, 1909, p. 115. Retrieved from Google Book Search.

External links

Albert Francis Blakeslee Papers at the Smith College Archives, Smith College Special Collections

American mycologists
1874 births
1954 deaths
Smith College faculty
University of Connecticut faculty
Botanical Society of America
Wesleyan University alumni
Harvard University alumni

20th-century American botanists